Deep Space is an EP of the band Eisley, released on February 14, 2012 on Equal Vision Records. Originally the EP was going to contain a few b-sides from The Valley, but the band ultimately decided to record mostly new songs and changed the way of the EP as an anticipation of their fourth full-length album. The song "192 Days" had previously been released in demo form on the band's EP Fire Kite in 2009.

Track listing
All songs written by Eisley.

Notes

Eisley albums
2012 EPs